Lewis Cass Laylin (28 September 1848 – 17 November 1923) was a Republican politician who was in the Ohio House of Representatives, and was Ohio Secretary of State from 1901-1907.

Lewis Laylin was born September 28, 1848 in Norwalk, Huron County, Ohio. He graduated from Norwalk High School in 1867. In 1869, he was elected superintendent of the Bellevue public schools. He began study of law, and was admitted to the bar March 13, 1876.

Laylin was city clerk of Norwalk two years, a member of the Huron County board of school examiners twelve years, and president of the Norwalk City board of examiners three years. He was elected prosecuting attorney of Huron County in 1879, and served for seven years.

Laylin represented Huron County in the Ohio House of representatives from 1888 to 1893, in the 68th, 69th and 70th General Assemblies, selected by his peers as Speaker of the House in the 70th in 1892-1893.

Laylin was nominated in 1900 by the Republican Party for Ohio Secretary of State, and re-elected twice, serving a total of six years from 1901-1907.

Married November 3, 1880 to Frances L Dewey of Norwalk, and had three sons. He was a Mason. He died November 17, 1923, and is interred at Woodlawn Cemetery in Norwalk.

Notes

References

Secretaries of State of Ohio
Ohio lawyers
People from Norwalk, Ohio
1848 births
County district attorneys in Ohio
Speakers of the Ohio House of Representatives
Republican Party members of the Ohio House of Representatives
1923 deaths
19th-century American lawyers